Cary, North Carolina, held an election for mayor on Tuesday, October 8, 2019.

On July 10, 2019, Harold Weinbrecht, the incumbent mayor, announced that he was running for re-election. He was first elected in 2007 and re-elected in 2011 and 2015. Dero-Asha Davis-Weeks was Weinbrecht's sole challenger.

Harold Weinbrecht was elected to a fourth term, winning 84.1% of the vote.

Candidates
Dero-Asha Davis-Weeks, pharmacist
Harold Weinbrecht, Mayor of Cary since 2007

Results

References

External links
Campaign websites
Dero-Asha Davis-Weeks campaign website 
Harold Weinbrecht personal website

Cary
Cary
Cary